Annezin is a commune in the Pas-de-Calais department in the Hauts-de-France region of France.

Geography

Population
The inhabitants are called Annezinois.

Sights
 The church of St. Martin, dating from the sixteenth century.
 Remains of an old watermill.

See also
Communes of the Pas-de-Calais department

References

External links

 The CWGC graves in the communal cemetery

Communes of Pas-de-Calais